The McGurck Block is an historic structure located at 611 5th Avenue in San Diego's Gaslamp Quarter, in the U.S. state of California. It was built in 1887.

See also
 List of Gaslamp Quarter historic buildings
 List of San Diego Historic Landmarks

References

External links

 

1887 establishments in California
Buildings and structures completed in 1887
Buildings and structures in San Diego
Gaslamp Quarter, San Diego